Oleksandr Anatoliyovych Humenyuk (born 6 October 1976) is a Ukrainian football coach and a former player. He manages FSC Bukovyna Chernivtsi.

References

External links
 

1976 births
Sportspeople from Khmelnytskyi, Ukraine
Living people
Ukrainian footballers
FC Borysfen Boryspil players
FC CSKA Kyiv players
FC Dnipro players
FC Metalurh Novomoskovsk players
FC Kremin Kremenchuk players
FC Dnipro-2 Dnipropetrovsk players
FC Chernomorets Novorossiysk players
Russian Premier League players
Ukrainian expatriate footballers
Expatriate footballers in Russia
FC Dnipro Cherkasy players
FC Chornomorets Odesa players
FC Chornomorets-2 Odesa players
FC Volyn Lutsk players
FC Metalist Kharkiv players
FC Stal Kamianske players
FC Dynamo Khmelnytskyi players
FC Krymteplytsia Molodizhne players
Ukrainian football managers
FC Bukovyna Chernivtsi managers
Association football goalkeepers